Khromykh is a surname. It comes from Proto-Slavic *xromъ and means lame, limping. Cognates of Khromykh include Polish Chromy and Czech Chromý.

Khromykh may refer to:
 Anton Khromykh (born 1982), Ukrainian football midfielder
 Maiia Khromykh (born 2006), Russian figure skater

References

See also
 

Russian-language surnames